The 1954 U.S. National Championships (now known as the US Open) was a tennis tournament that took place on the outdoor grass courts at the West Side Tennis Club, Forest Hills in New York City, United States. The tournament ran from 28 August until 6 September. It was the 74th staging of the U.S. National Championships, and the fourth Grand Slam tennis event of the year.

Finals

Men's singles

 Vic Seixas defeated   Rex Hartwig  3–6, 6–2, 6–4, 6–4

Women's singles

 Doris Hart defeated  Louise Brough  6–8, 6–1, 8–6

Men's doubles
 Vic Seixas /  Tony Trabert defeated  Lew Hoad /  Ken Rosewall 3–6, 6–4, 8–6, 6–3

Women's doubles
 Shirley Fry /  Doris Hart defeated  Louise Brough /  Margaret Osborne duPont 6–4, 6–4

Mixed doubles
 Doris Hart /   Vic Seixas defeated  Margaret Osborne duPont /  Ken Rosewall 4–6, 6–1, 6–1

References

External links
Official US Open website

 
U.S. National Championships
U.S. National Championships (tennis) by year
U.S. National Championships
U.S. National Championships
U.S. National Championships
U.S. National Championships